This is a list of Philadelphia Flyers broadcasters.

Television
Flyers games are broadcast by NBC Sports Philadelphia (formerly Comcast SportsNet), NBC Sports Philadelphia Plus (formerly Comcast Network) and NBC 10. 

The 2007–08 season was the first season for CN8, which was later rebranded as the Comcast Network.

Play-by-Play
Stu Nahan & Gene Hart (1967–1968)
Stu Nahan (1968–1971)
Bill White (1970–71, WPVI Channel 6 games only)
Pat Shetler (1971–72)
Gene Hart & Don Earle (1971–1977)
Gene Hart (1977–1988, 1992–1995)
Pete Silverman (1979-80 PRISM)
Don Tollefson (1982–84, WPVI Channel 6 games only)
Mike Emrick (1980–1983, 1988–1992)
Jim Jackson (1995–present)

Color commentary
Larry Zeidel (1971–72)
Bobby Taylor (1976–1989)
Bill Clement (1989–1992, 2007–2020, as a fill-in for Keith Jones)
Gary Dornhoefer (1992–2006)
Steve Coates (1999–2014, booth color commentator and “Inside-the-Glass” reporter)
Keith Jones (2006–present)
Chris Therien (2014–2018, “Inside-the-Glass” reporter)
Scott Hartnell (2021–present, as a fill-in for Keith Jones during his NHL on TNT assignments)
Brian Boucher (2021–present, as a fill-in for Keith Jones during his NHL on TNT assignments)
Al Morganti (2022-present, as a fill-in for one game in Los Angeles against the Kings for Keith Jones during the 2023 NHL Winter Classic on TNT)

Radio
Games can also be heard on 97.5 WPEN and 93.3 WMMR in Philadelphia. Flyers games can also be heard in the Atlantic City area on WENJ 97.3 and WPGG 1450. Prior to 1988, the Flyers simulcasted audio both on radio and TV when games were televised. Simulcasts began in 1972-73. 

For the first three seasons, radio broadcasts began 90 minutes after game time; TV always covered the entire game. From 1968-69 thru 1971-72, games were on either radio or TV, but not both.

Play-by-Play
Stu Nahan & Gene Hart (19671968)
Hugh Gannon (19681971)
Gene Hart & Don Earle (19711977)
Ralph Lawler(197677)
Gene Hart (19771992)
Mike Emrick (19921993)
Jim Jackson (19931995)
Steve Carroll (19951996)
John Wiedeman (19961997)
Tim Saunders (1997present)

Stu Nahan usually did play-by-play on West Coast games.

Color commentary
Ron Weber (1972-1974)
Ralph Lawler (1974-1975)
Hugh Gannon (1975-1976)
Pete Silverman (1975-1977)
Terry Crisp (1976-1977) 
Bobby Taylor (1976–1992)
Steve Coates (1992–1999, 2014–present)
Brian Propp (1999–2008)
Chris Therien (2008–2014)

Weber, Lawler, and Gannon provided color commentary on home games while Crisp provided color commentary whenever he wasn't playing.  Silverman filled in on road games when Gene Hart was doing national broadcasts.

References

External links
Flyers History - Flyers Hall of Fame Profile - Gene Hart
Meltzer, Bill Hockey's great voices echo through generations

 
Philadelphia Flyers
broadcasters
SportsChannel
NBC Sports Regional Networks